Catapariprosopa is a genus of flies in the family Tachinidae.

Species
C. curvicauda Townsend, 1927
C. rubiginans (Villeneuve, 1932)

References

Phasiinae
Diptera of Asia
Tachinidae genera
Taxa named by Charles Henry Tyler Townsend